The 2021 season was Kuala Lumpur City's 43rd season in competitive season and the 1st season in the Malaysia Super League since being promoted from 2020 Malaysia Premier League. This is club's first season after rebranded as Kuala Lumpur City Football Club.

Management team

Squad information

Appearances in all competitions.Note: Flags indicate national team as has been defined under FIFA eligibility rules. Players may hold more than one non-FIFA nationality.

Transfers

1st leg
In:

Out:

2nd leg
In:

Out

Competitions

Malaysia Super League

League table

Results by round

Matches

Malaysia Cup

Group stage

The draw for the group stage was held on 15 September 2021.

Knockout stage

Quarter-finals

Semi-finals

Final

Statistics

Appearances and goals
Players with no appearances not included in the list.

Goalscorers

Clean sheets

References

External links
 Official website

Kuala Lumpur City F.C.
2021
Kuala Lumpur City